Monika Dettwiler (born 17 April 1948) is a Swiss-Italian journalist and author.

Life 
Monika Dettwiler was born in Zürich, 17 April 1948. She has a doctorate in history and studied history, art history and archeology in Rome, where she initially worked as a journalist and organizer of cultural tours. Her first novel, "Berner Lauffeuer", was published in 1998 and was on the bestseller list of the "Schweizer Buchhändler- und Verleger-Verband" (Swiss Booksellers and Publishers Association) for five months. In 1999, Dettwiler returned to Switzerland. She worked as a journalist at the Reformierte Presse from the year 2000 and was co-editor-in-chief from 2007 until her retirement in 2013.

She lives in Kanton Zürich and has two sons.

Works

Novels 
 Berner Lauffeuer. Roman zur Gründung des Schweizer Bundesstaates. Zytglogge, Gümligen 1998, 
 Das Siegel der Macht. Ein historischer Roman um das Jahr 1000. Weitbrecht, Stuttgart/Vienna/Bern 2000, .
 Der goldene Fluss. Historischer Roman. Kabel, Munich 2003, .
 Meerfeuer. Die Geschichte der Augustine W. Roman. Zytglogge, Oberhofen am Thunersee 2008, .
 Nordwestbrise Historischer Roman. Appenzeller Verlag, Herisau 2012, .

Short stories 
 Im Morgenrot. Die besten Kriminalgeschichten aus der Schweiz. Scherz, Bern 2001, .
 Aroser Urne für Trinidad. In: Paul Ott (Hrsg.): Tatort Schweiz. 18 kriminelle Geschichten. Limmat, Zürich 2005, S. 9–24.
 Seegrund. In: Paul Ott (Hrsg.): Tatort Schweiz 2. 23 kriminelle Geschichten aus der viersprachigen Schweiz. Limmat, Zürich 2007, .
 Die Radikalen sind eine höllische Drachenbrut. in: Paul Ott, Fritz von Gunten (Hrsg.): Gotthelf lesen – auf dem Weg zum Original. hep Verlag ag, Bern 2004, .

References

External links 
 Official website

1948 births
Living people
20th-century Swiss historians
20th-century Swiss journalists
21st-century Swiss journalists
20th-century Italian journalists
21st-century Italian journalists
Swiss women short story writers
Swiss short story writers
Italian writers in German
Swiss women journalists
Swiss women historians